Abdrakhmanovo (Abdraxman) is a rural locality (a village) in Pervomaysky Selsoviet of Sterlitamaksky District, Bashkortostan, Russia. The population was 260 as of 2010. There are 3 streets.

Geography 
Abdrakhmanovo is located 50 km northwest of Sterlitamak (the district's administrative centre) by road. Pervomayskoye is the nearest rural locality.

Ethnicity 
The village is inhabited by Bashkirs and others.

References 

Rural localities in Sterlitamaksky District